This is a list of Spanish football transfers for the summer sale in the 2014–15 season of La Liga and Segunda División. Only moves from La Liga and Segunda División are listed.

The summer transfer window began on 1 July 2014, although a few transfers took place prior to that date. The window closed at midnight on 1 September 2014. Players without a club can join one at any time, either during or in between transfer windows. Clubs below La Liga level can also sign players on loan at any time. If need be, clubs can sign a goalkeeper on an emergency loan, if all others are unavailable.

Summer 2014 La Liga transfer window

La Liga

Almería
Manager: Francisco Rodríguez (2nd season)

In:

Out:

Athletic Bilbao
Manager: Ernesto Valverde (2nd season)

In:

Out:

Atlético Madrid
Manager:  Diego Simeone (4th season)

In:

Out:

Barcelona
Manager: Luis Enrique Martínez (1st season)

In:

Out:

Celta Vigo
Manager:  Eduardo Berizzo (1st season)
 

In:

Out:

Córdoba
Manager: Albert Ferrer (2nd season)
 

In:

Out:

Deportivo La Coruña
Manager: Víctor Fernández (1st season)
 

In:

Out:

Eibar
Manager: Gaizka Garitano (3rd season)

 

In:

Out:

Elche
Manager: Fran Escribá (3rd season)

 

In:

Out:

Espanyol
Manager: Sergio González (1st season)
 

In:

Out:

Getafe
Manager:  Cosmin Contra (2nd season)
 

In:

Out:

Granada
Manager: Joaquín Caparrós (1st season)
 

In:

Out:

Levante
Manager: José Luis Mendilibar (1st season)
 

In:

Out:

Málaga
Manager: Javi Gracia (1st season)
 

In:

Out:

Rayo Vallecano
Manager: Paco Jémez (3rd season)
 

In:

Out:

Real Madrid
Manager:  Carlo Ancelotti (2nd season)

 

In:

Out:

Real Sociedad
Manager: Jagoba Arrasate (2nd season)

 

In:

Out:

Sevilla
Manager: Unai Emery (3rd season)

 

In:

Out:

Valencia
Manager:  Nuno Espírito Santo (1st season)
 

In:

Out:

Villarreal
Manager: Marcelino García Toral (3rd season)
 

In:

Out:

Segunda División

Alavés
Manager: Alberto López (2nd season)

In:

Out:

Albacete
Manager: Luis César Sampedro (3rd season)

In:

Out:

Alcorcón
Manager: Pepe Bordalás (2nd season)

In:

Out:

Barcelona B
Manager: Eusebio Sacristán (4th season)

In:

Out:

Betis
Manager: Julio Velázquez (1st season)

In:

Out:

Girona
Manager: Pablo Machín (2nd season)

In:

Out:

Las Palmas
Manager: Paco Herrera (1st season)

In:

Out:

Leganés
Manager: Asier Garitano (2nd season)

In:

Out:

Llagostera
Manager: Santi Castillejo (1st season)

In:

Out:

Lugo
Manager: Quique Setién (6th season)

In:

Out:

Mallorca
Manager:  Valery Karpin (1st season)

In:

Out:

Mirandés
Manager: Carlos Terrazas (2nd season)

In:

Out:

Numancia
Manager: Juan Antonio Anquela (2nd season)

In:

Out:

Osasuna
Manager:  Jan Urban (1st season)

In:

Out:

Ponferradina
Manager: Manolo Díaz (1st season)

In:

Out:

Racing de Santander
Manager: Paco Fernández (2nd season)

In:

Out:

Recreativo Huelva
Manager: José Luis Oltra (1st season)

In:

Out:

Sabadell
Manager: Miquel Olmo (2nd season)

In:

Out:

Sporting Gijón
Manager: Abelardo Fernández (2nd season)

In:

Out:

Tenerife
Manager: Álvaro Cervera (3rd season)

In:

Out:

Valladolid
Manager: Francesc Rubi (1st season)

In:

Out:

Zaragoza
Manager: Víctor Muñoz (2nd season)

In:

Out:

See also
List of Spanish football transfers winter 2014–15

References

Spanish
2014
2014
Transfers
2014